Eupithecia hysterica is a moth in the family Geometridae. It is found in Tajikistan.

The length of the forewings is 21–23 mm for males and 24–26 mm for females.

References

Moths described in 1988
hysterica
Moths of Asia